Selma Terrace is a historic apartment complex in Omaha, Nebraska. It was built in 1916, and designed in the Prairie School style by architect Richard Everette. It has been listed on the National Register of Historic Places since July 2, 2008.

References

National Register of Historic Places in Omaha, Nebraska
Prairie School architecture in Nebraska
Residential buildings completed in 1916
1916 establishments in Nebraska